

Peerage of England 

|rowspan=2|Earl of Northampton (1080)||Simon Saint-Lis, 2nd Earl of Northampton||1109||1153||Died
|-
|Simon Saint-Lis, 3rd Earl of Northampton||1153||1184|| 
|-
|Earl of Surrey (1088)||Isabel de Warenne, 4th Countess of Surrey||1148||1199|| 
|-
|rowspan=2|Earl of Warwick (1088)||Roger de Beaumont, 2nd Earl of Warwick||1119||1153||Died
|-
|William de Beaumont, 3rd Earl of Warwick||1153||1184|| 
|-
|Earl of Buckingham (1097)||Walter Giffard, 2nd Earl of Buckingham||1102||1164|| 
|-
|rowspan=2|Earl of Devon (1141)||Baldwin de Redvers, 1st Earl of Devon||1107||1155||Died
|-
|Richard de Redvers, 2nd Earl of Devon||1155||1162|| 
|-
|Earl of Leicester (1107)||Robert de Beaumont, 2nd Earl of Leicester||1118||1168|| 
|-
|rowspan=2|Earl of Chester (1121)||Ranulph de Gernon, 2nd Earl of Chester||1129||1153||Died
|-
|Hugh de Kevelioc, 3rd Earl of Chester||1153||1181|| 
|-
|Earl of Gloucester (1121)||William Fitzrobert, 2nd Earl of Gloucester||1147||1183|| 
|-
|rowspan=2|Earl of Hertford (1135)||Gilbert de Clare, 2nd Earl of Hertford||1136||1151||Died
|-
|Roger de Clare, 3rd Earl of Hertford||1151||1173|| 
|-
|Earl of Richmond (1136)||Conan IV, Duke of Brittany||1146||1171|| 
|-
|Earl of Arundel (1138)||William d'Aubigny, 1st Earl of Arundel||1138||1176|| 
|-
|Earl of Derby (1138)||Robert de Ferrers, 2nd Earl of Derby||1139||1162|| 
|-
|Earl of Pembroke (1138)||Richard de Clare, 2nd Earl of Pembroke||1147||1176|| 
|-
|Earl of Essex (1139)||Geoffrey de Mandeville, 2nd Earl of Essex||1144||1160|| 
|-
|Earl of Norfolk (1140)||Hugh Bigod, 1st Earl of Norfolk||1140||1177|| 
|-
|Earl of Cornwall (1141)||Reginald de Dunstanville, 1st Earl of Cornwall||1141||1175|| 
|-
|Earl of Hereford (1141)||Roger Fitzmiles, 2nd Earl of Hereford||1143||1155||Died
|-
|Earl of Kent (1141)||William de Ipres, 1st Earl of Kent||1141||1155||Deprived
|-
|Earl of Lincoln (1141)||William de Roumare, 1st Earl of Lincoln||1141||1155||Died
|-
|Earl of Oxford (1142)||Aubrey de Vere, 1st Earl of Oxford||1142||1194|| 
|-
|Earl of Salisbury (1145)||Patrick of Salisbury, 1st Earl of Salisbury||1145||1168|| 
|-
|Earl of Lincoln (1147)||Gilbert de Gant, Earl of Lincoln||1147||1156||Died

Peerage of Scotland 

|Earl of Mar (1114)||Morggán, Earl of Mar||Abt. 1140||Abt. 1178||
|-
|Earl of Dunbar (1115)||Gospatric III, Earl of Dunbar||1138||1166||
|-
|Earl of Angus (1115)||Gille Brigte, Earl of Angus||1135||1187||
|-
|rowspan=2|Earl of Atholl (1115)||Máel Muire, Earl of Atholl||1115||Abt 1150||Died
|-
|Máel Coluim, Earl of Atholl||Abt 1150||Abt 1190||
|-
|Earl of Buchan (1115)||Colbán, Earl of Buchan||Abt. 1135||Abt. 1180||
|-
|Earl of Strathearn (1115)||Ferchar, Earl of Strathearn||Abt. 1140||1171||
|-
|rowspan=2|Earl of Fife (1129)||Donnchad I, Earl of Fife||1139||1154||Died
|-
|Donnchad II, Earl of Fife||1154||1203||
|-
|Earl of Ross (1157)||Malcolm MacHeth, Earl of Ross||1157||1168||
|-
|}

References 

 

Lists of peers by decade
1150s in England
12th century in Scotland
12th-century English people
12th-century mormaers
Peers